Big Brothers Big Sisters is a non-profit federation with a focus on mentoring programs for youth since 1913. The Big Brothers Big Sisters movement in Canada provides services to 41,700 youth in over 1,100 communities.

Programs 
Big Brothers Big Sisters agencies offer a range of mentoring programs to meet the needs of Canadian children and families. In the traditional one-to-one mentoring programs, one youth and one adult mentor meet twice a month for at least one year. Big Brothers Big Sisters also operates group mentoring programs for teenagers and clubs for newcomer Canadian youth.

Impact 
In 2013, the Boston Consulting Group conducted a research study on the impact of Big Brothers Big Sisters mentoring programs. The study concluded that every dollar spent on Big Brothers Big Sisters results in a $18-$23 social return on investment based on increased earnings, charitable contributions, and volunteerism. In addition, former mentees described the mentoring relationship as a "transformational moment" that improved their confidence, happiness, and mental health.

History 
The youth mentoring movement began in the USA in 1904, when a young New York City court clerk named Ernest Coulter was seeing more and more boys come through his courtroom. He recognized that caring adults could help many of these kids stay out of trouble, and he set out to find volunteers. He asked a number of his friends to spend some of their time – lending a hand to youngsters, starting with 39 volunteers. That marked the beginning of the Big Brothers movement. By 1916, Big Brothers had spread to 96 cities across the United States.

In 1912, similar events took place in Canada and the first Canadian Big Sister agency formed in Toronto. Closely afterwards, in 1913, the first Canadian Big Brother program began in Toronto. Both groups continued to work independently until 1977, when Big Brothers of America and Big Sisters International (in America) joined forces and became Big Brothers Big Sisters of America. In 2001 a similar merger occurred between the two Canadian organizations and Big Brothers Big Sisters of Canada was formed. Interest grew from outside North America, spurring the formation of Big Brothers Big Sisters International to help other countries get started and facilitate communications between countries running similar programs.

References

External links
Big Brothers Big Sisters of Canada - Mission/Vision
Big Brothers Big Sisters of Canada

Mentorships
Children's charities based in Canada